Benjamin Rabier (1864–1939) was a French illustrator, comic book artist and animator. He became famous for creating La vache qui rit and is one of the precursors of animal comics. His work has inspired many other artists, notably Hergé and Edmond-François Calvo.

A native of La Roche-sur-Yon, Vendée, Rabier started to work as an illustrator for various newspapers after meeting Caran d'Ache. His first album for children was the story of Tintin-Lutin, published in 1898, which told of a young lutin or "imp"; here his main characters are human and not animals, as they came to be in later albums. His most famous creations are Gideon the duck and the characters he drew for Le roman de Renart.

He died at Faverolles, Indre, in 1939.

Bibliography
 Olivier Calon, Benjamin Rabier, Paris, Tallandier, 2004

External links

  Tintin-Lutin
  About Benjamin Rabier
  Tintin Lutin
 Benjamin Rabier An animated documentary about "the creator of the Laughing Cow and pioneer of cartoon" on crowdfunding platform Ulule
 Issues of Histoire comique et Naturelle des Animaux in Gallica, the digital library of the BnF.

1864 births
1939 deaths
People from La Roche-sur-Yon
French illustrators
French comics artists
French animators
French animated film directors
Enid Blyton illustrators